The  Bras de la Plaine Bridge is a road bridge over the Bras de la Plaine river in Réunion, France.
The Bras de la Plaine bridge crosses one of the deeper gorges on the island.

The  single-span bridge is essentially two bridges, each composed of a steel Warren truss, that meet in the middle. The  bridge comprises a  bi-directional carriageway, two  pedestrian pavements and two  cycle paths.
The deck is a prestressed, composite truss structure comprising two concrete slabs linked by two planes of steel tubes in triangular layout.

The Bras de la Plaine Bridge received the 2003 Outstanding Structure Award from the International Association for Bridge and Structural Engineering for being an elegant slender single span composite truss bridge with innovative construction details.

See also
 List of bridges in France

External links
 
 IABSE Outstanding Structure Award

Bridges in France
Transport in Réunion
Bridges completed in 2002
Truss bridges
Cantilever bridges
Concrete bridges
2002 establishments in Réunion
21st-century architecture in France